Admiral Colville may refer to:

Alexander Colville, 7th Lord Colville of Culross (1717–1770), British Royal Navy vice admiral
John Colville, 9th Lord Colville of Culross (1768–1849), British Royal Navy admiral
Stanley Colville (1861–1939), British Royal Navy admiral